Thorsness is a surname. Notable people with the surname include:

Kristen Thorsness (born 1960), American rower
Leo K. Thorsness (1932–2017), United States Air Force officer and Medal of Honor recipient

See also
Thorness (disambiguation)